Marisat 3 (or Marisat F3) is a communications satellite operated by COMSAT. Marisat 3 was the second of a series of COMSAT maritime communications satellites.

Satellite 
The satellite was operated at orbital position of 176 degrees east from 1976 to 1991. It was transferred to 182° E (178° W) and operated there until 1996. It was transferred to 326.1° E (33.9° W), Over the Atlantic Ocean, and since 1999 has been providing a broadband data link to the US National Antarctic Foundation in Antarctica at the South Pole's Amundsen-Scott research station. The same was transferred to Intelsat in 2004. On Wednesday, October 29, 2008, after 32 years of service, the longest for any commercial satellite to date, was removed from active service. Intelsat engineers used the remaining fuel on board to raise the orbit about 125 miles (200 km) above the geostationary arc and put it into an array orbit.

Launch 
Marisat 3 was launched by a Delta rocket from Cape Canaveral Air Force Station, Florida, at 22:44 UTC on October 14, 1976.

See also 
 1976 in spaceflight

References 

Satellites of the United States
Intelsat satellites